Francesco Soldera (28 December 1892 – 20 February 1957) was an Italian professional footballer who played as a midfielder.

External links 
Profile at MagliaRossonera.it 
Profile at Inter.it

1892 births
1957 deaths
Italian footballers
Association football midfielders
A.C. Milan players
Inter Milan players